Charlene Bearhead is an educator and Indigenous education advocate. She was the first educational lead for the University of Manitoba's National Centre for Truth and Reconciliation.

Personal life 
Bearhead grew-up in Drayton valley, Alberta. She is a mother, grandmother, and educator with decades of experience in the educator sector.

Career 
She received a degree in education from the University of Alberta in 1985. Bearhead holds teaching certificates for both Alberta and Manitoba. She has taught for Parkland School Division and Calgary School District in Alberta and St. Vital School Division in Manitoba. She was principal of Paul First Nation School and has served as superintendent of education for the Paul First Nation. She founded Mother Earth's Children's Charter School in Wabamun in 2003 and served as its first principal. Bearhead helped establish an Aboriginal Circle program and developed a Youth Cultural Reconciliation Special Project for public schools in Edmonton. She also served as interim education director for the Alexander First Nation.

She led negotiation of the First Nations and Inuit Child Care Initiative on behalf of Treaty 6, Treaty 7, Treaty 8 Alberta as well as Ontario. She led the establishment of the Early Childhood Services division for the Alberta regional office of the First Nations and Inuit Health Branch of Health Canada.

Alongside Sylvia Smith, Bearhead was the national coordinator for Project of Heart, which was tasked with educating Canadians on the history and legacy of residential schools. From 2015 to 2017, Bearhead was the education coordinator for the National Centre for Truth and Reconciliation at the University of Manitoba. She subsequently was named education coordinator for the National Inquiry into Murdered and Missing Indigenous Women and Girls.

Bearhead was the education adviser for the Canadian Geographic Indigenous Peoples Atlas of Canada project.

References 

Year of birth missing (living people)
Living people
Canadian educators
First Nations activists
University of Alberta alumni